In Your Multitude is the third full-length album by the Norwegian progressive metal/power metal band, Conception, released in 1995.

Track listing

Personnel
All information from the album booklet.
Band members
 Roy Khan – vocals
 Tore Østby – guitar
 Ingar Amlien – bass
 Arve Heimdal – drums

Additional personnel
 Trond Nagell-dahl – keyboards
 Tommy Newton – guitars on "Guilt", producer, engineering, mixing, mastering
 Wilhelm Makkee – mastering
 Stefano Scheiba – engineering assistant
 Martin Romeis – photography
 Thomas Bucher – layout, typography
 Michael Albers – cover art

References

Conception (band) albums
1995 albums
Noise Records albums